Clinton Marsh (born 19 January 1972) is a former professional tennis player from South Africa.

Career
Marsh was a gifted junior player, ranked number one in his country every year from the age of 12 to 17. He and Marcos Ondruska were boys' doubles finalists at the 1990 French Open and 1990 Wimbledon Championships. They lost both finals to the Canadian pairing of Sébastien Lareau and Sébastien Leblanc. 

Playing as a qualifier, Marsh lost to 16th seed Richard Krajicek in the first round of the 1995 Australian Open.

References

1972 births
Living people
South African male tennis players
Sportspeople from Durban